The Cicadinae are a subfamily of cicadas, containing the translucent cicadas. They are robust cicadas and many have gaudy colors, but they generally lack the butterfly-like opaque wing markings found in many species of the related Tibiceninae.

Systematics
This large subfamily is here divided into  tribes. Other schemes exist, which usually have a coarser subdivision. Some, however, merge the Tibiceninae here whole or partly. The genera given below were substantially revised 2010 through 2018 due to additional morphological and molecular phylogenetic analysis.

The following tribes belong to the subfamily Cicadinae:

 Arenopsaltriini Moulds, 2018
 Burbungini Moulds, 2005
 Cicadatrini Distant, 1905
 Cicadini Latreille, 1802
 Cicadmalleuini Boulard & Puissant, 2013
 Cosmopsaltriini Kato, 1932
 Cryptotympanini Handlirsch, 1925
 Cyclochilini Distant, 1904
 Distantadini Orian, 1963
 Dundubiini Atkinson, 1886
 Durangonini Moulds & Marshall, 2018
 Fidicinini Distant, 1905
 Gaeanini Distant 1905
 Jassopsaltriini Moulds, 2005
 Lahugadini Distant 1905
 Leptopsaltriini Moulton, J.C., 1923
 Macrotristriini Moulds, 2018
 Oncotympanini Ishihara, 1961
 Orapini Boulard, 1985
 Platypleurini Schmidt, 1918
 Plautillini Distant, 1905
 Polyneurini Amyot & Audinet-Serville, 1843
 Psaltodini Moulds, 2018
 Psithyristriini Distant, 1905
 Sinosenini Boulard, 1975
 Sonatini Lee 2010
 genus Hyalessa China, 1925
 Talcopsaltriini Moulds, 2008
 Tamasini Moulds, 2005
 Thophini Distant, 1904
 Tosenini Amyot & Serville, 1843
 Zammarini Distant, 1905

The names Platypleurini Schmidt, 1918 and Hamzini Distant 1905 refer to the same tribe. The question of name priority was submitted to the ICZN for resolution in 2018 (case 3761). The tribe Oncotympanini was reduced to subtribe level and transferred to Cicadini in 2010, but was later returned to tribe status.

Some notable genera include:

 Tribe Cicadini
 Cicada
 Euterpnosia
 Illyria

 Leptosemia

 Neocicada

 Terpnosia
 Tribe Cicadatrini
 Mogannia
 Tribe Cryptotympanini
 Antankaria
 Auritibicen
 Chremistica
 Cryptotympana
 Hadoa
 Heteropsaltria
 Neotibicen
 Nggeliana
 Raiateana
 Salvazana
 Tacua
 Tribe Cyclochilini
 Cyclochila

 Tribe Dundubiini
 Aceropyga

 Calcagninus

 Cosmopsaltria
 Diceropyga
 Dundubia
 Macrosemia

 Maua
 Megapomponia
 Meimuna
 Nabalua
 Orientopsaltria
 Platylomia
 Purana
 Tanna
 Tribe Fidicinini
 Diceroprocta
 Hyantia
 Mura
 Quesada
 Tribe Macrotristriini
 Macrotristria
 Tribe Oncotympanini
 Oncotympana
 Tribe Platypleurini
 Platypleura
 Pycna
 Ugada

 Tribe Psaltodini
 Psaltoda
 Psithyristriini Distant, 1905 
 Pomponia
 Tribe Thophini
 Thopha
 Arunta

See also
 List of Cicadinae genera

References

Further reading

 
Cicadidae
Hemiptera subfamilies